Midland is a provincial electoral district (riding) in the Canadian province of Manitoba. It was created by redistribution in 2008. The riding is centred on the community of Carman. Following the 2018 redistribution, the riding also began to include the community of Morris.

List of provincial representatives

Electoral results

2011 general election

2016 general election

2019 general election

See also
Canadian provincial electoral districts

References

Manitoba provincial electoral districts
2008 establishments in Manitoba